Slamnjak is a small settlement in the hills south of Ljutomer in northeastern Slovenia. The area traditionally belonged to the Styria region and is now included in the Mura Statistical Region.

The painter Ante Trstenjak was born in the village in 1894.

References

External links
Slamnjak on Geopedia

Populated places in the Municipality of Ljutomer